Gabriel Mendoza (born 22 June 1906, date of death unknown) was a Peruvian long-distance runner. He competed in the marathon at the 1936 Summer Olympics.

References

1906 births
Year of death missing
Athletes (track and field) at the 1936 Summer Olympics
Peruvian male long-distance runners
Peruvian male marathon runners
Olympic athletes of Peru
Place of birth missing